Gerald Hamilton (c. 1888-1970) was an Irish memoirist, critic, and internationalist.

Gerald Hamilton may also refer to:

 Gerald Hamilton (architect) (1923–1999), architect in Vancouver, British Columbia
 Gerald Hamilton, singer for The Crows
 Gerald Hamilton, president of Klamath Community College

See also 
 Gerald Edwin Hamilton Barrett-Hamilton (1871–1914), British natural historian